Yucca arkansana, the Arkansas yucca, is a plant in the family Asparagaceae, native to Texas, Oklahoma, Arkansas, Missouri and Kansas. It generally grows in gravelly, sunlit locations such as rocky outcrops, prairies, etc. It is not considered to be threatened.

Yucca arkansana is one of the smaller members of the genus Yucca, acaulescent or with a stem no more than 15 cm tall. Flowers are greenish-white, borne on a flowering stalk up to 80 cm (30 inches) tall.

A number of yucca moths lay their eggs upon Y. arkansana as a host plant, an example being Tegeticula intermedia.

References

arkansana
Flora of Arkansas
Plants described in 1902
Flora of Texas
Flora of Oklahoma
Flora of Kansas
Flora of Missouri
Flora of Louisiana
Taxa named by William Trelease